Counting Stars is the ninth studio album by the American contemporary Christian musician Andrew Peterson. It was released through Centricity Music on July 27, 2010.

Background
Peterson worked with Andy Gullahorn and Ben Shive, in the production of this album. Centricity Music released the album on July 27, 2010.

Critical reception

James Christopher Monger, rating the album three and a half stars for AllMusic, says, "Counting Stars may walk a familiar line, but with songs as effortless and engaging as 'Many Roads' and 'World Traveler,' it makes for a fine afternoon stroll." Awarding the album four stars from CCM Magazine, Andrew Greer states, "And what others hear as dirges of human despair, Peterson's infamous imagination transforms into fantastical carols of hope." Josh Hurst, giving the album four star at Christianity Today, writes, "On Counting Stars, Peterson is just a humble folksinger, his music tasteful and elegant, and never flashy." Indicating in a perfect ten review by Cross Rhythms, Paul Kerslake recognizes, "Folk-orientated music can sometimes become a bit repetitive, but the combination of finely-crafted songs and adept musicianship raises this album to the highest level." Laura Nunnery Love, signaling in a four and a half star review from Jesus Freak Hideout, describes, "Counting Stars is another success for Andrew Peterson, and the last five songs prove the artist can stretch beyond his comfort zone."

Reviewing the album for Worship Leader, Jeremy Armstrong responds, "Each of the 12 songs are beautifully sedate, yet winsomely inviting; they stand as poetic jewels...in such a sublime maze of intricate loveliness that everything kind of melds together." Timothy Estabrooks, assigning a four and a half star review to the album, replies, "Due to its less pop oriented nature, Counting Stars is perhaps not the most accessible of Peterson's albums, but to those who are already familiar with his work, it is yet another beautiful masterpiece displaying his delightful ability to create beauty in simplicity." Specifying in a four star review at Louder Than the Music, Jono Davies calls, Counting Stars "some amazing poetic music." Rebecca Rycross, penning a review for Christian Music Review, recognizes, "this is a superb album! Andrew Peterson has outdone himself. His vocals are better than ever, his writing gets more and more captivating with each new album. He is a true artist."

Track listing

Chart performance

Personnel 
Musicians

Andrew Peterson: Lead Vocals, Accordion, Banjo, Acoustic Guitar, Piano

Ben Shive: Accordion, Hammond B-3, Harmonium, Keyboards, Percussion, Piano, Timbales, Backing Vocals

Andy Gullahorn: Accordion, Bouzouki, Acoustic Guitar, Electric Guitar, Mandolin, Backing Vocals

Gabe Scott: Banjo, Bouzouki, Dobro, Hammered Dulcimer, Keyboards, Lap Steel, Percussion, Piano, Timbales, Backing Vocals

Stuart Duncan: Fiddle

Randall Goodgame: Backing Vocals

Jason Gray: Backing Vocals

James Gregory: Bass

Sara Groves: Backing Vocals

David Henry: Cello, Violin

Ken Lewis: Drums, Percussion

Andrew Osenga: Electric Guitar

John Painter: Horns

Melanie Penn: Backing Vocals

Eric Peters: Backing Vocals

Jill Phillips: Backing Vocals

Technical

Ben Shive: Producer, Programming, String Arrangements

Andy Gullahorn: Producer

Bob Boyd: Mastering

Lani Crump: Mixing Coordinator

Stuart Duncan: String Arrangements

Whit Elam: Sound Ideas

Micah Kandros: Photography

Erin Kraus: Assistant

Brannon McCallister: Design, Layout

Todd Robbins: Engineer

Shane D. Wilson: Mixing

References

2010 albums
Centricity Music albums
Andrew Peterson (musician) albums